Fussball Club Vaduz (Football Club Vaduz) is a professional football club from Vaduz, Liechtenstein that plays in the Swiss Challenge League. The club plays at the national Rheinpark Stadion, which has a capacity of 5,873 when all seated but has additional standing places in the North and South ends of the ground, giving a total stadium capacity of 7,838. They currently play in the Swiss Challenge League following relegation from the Swiss Super League after the 2020–21 season. Vaduz is unique in that it represents its own national association in the UEFA Europa Conference League when winning the domestic cup, whilst playing in another country's league. This is due to Liechtenstein not organising its own league.

Vaduz have historically had many players from Liechtenstein, many of whom have played for the Liechtenstein national team, but nearly all these players have moved abroad, and now the majority of the first team squad are foreign players from different areas of the world.

On 25 August 2022, after beating Rapid Wien away in Austria, Vaduz made history by qualifying for the group stage of the Europa Conference League, becoming the first ever club from Liechtenstein to reach the group stages of a UEFA club competition.

History

Fussball Club Vaduz was founded on 14 February 1932 in Vaduz, and the club's first chairman was Johann Walser. FC Vaduz is the only professional football club in Liechtenstein. In its first training match, which Vaduz played in Balzers on 24 April of that year, the newly born team emerged as 2–1 winners. The club played in Vorarlberger Football Association in Austria for the 1932–33 season. In 1933, Vaduz began playing in Switzerland. Over the years Vaduz struggled through various tiers of Swiss football and won its first Liechtensteiner Cup in 1949. Vaduz enjoyed a lengthy stay in the Swiss 1. Liga from 1960 to 1973, which is the third tier of the Swiss football league system.

Vaduz has been required to pay a fee to the Swiss Football Association in order to participate as a foreign club, around £150,000 a year. There have been calls for this agreement to be revoked, but discussions have meant that a permanent arrangement has now taken place for a Liechtenstein representative to be allowed to participate in the Challenge League or Super League in future.

From the 2001–02 season, Vaduz played in the Swiss Challenge League (formerly called Nationalliga B), the second tier of the Swiss league system. Since then, Vaduz have been one of the best teams in the Challenge League and gave serious challenges towards promotion to the Super League, especially in 2004 and 2005, playing two-leg play-offs in both cases. In the 2007–08 season, Vaduz secured promotion to the Swiss Super League on 12 May 2008 by winning the Challenge League on the final day of the season, giving Liechtenstein a representative at the highest level of Swiss football for the first time. Vaduz, however, were relegated back to the Challenge League after one season in the top flight. Vaduz finally returned to top level after five years in the Challenge League.

In May 2010, the two Liechtenstein teams FC Vaduz and USV Eschen/Mauren decided on a better cooperation, especially on the exchange and the development possibilities of the players of both teams. In principle, the agreement should replace the missing substructure at FC Vaduz and promote cooperation in the sense of Liechtenstein football. FC Vaduz is the first address for professional footballers.

In 1992, Vaduz qualified for European football for the first time, entering the UEFA Cup Winners' Cup as Liechtenstein Cup winners, but lost 12–1 on aggregate to Chornomorets Odesa of Ukraine in the qualifying round. In 1996, Vaduz qualified for the first round proper with their first European victory, winning 5–3 on penalties against Universitate Riga of Latvia, after a 2–2 aggregate scoreline, although Vaduz lost their first round tie to Paris Saint-Germain of France 7–0 on aggregate.

After the Cup Winners' Cup was abolished, Vaduz have annually entered the UEFA Cup (now the UEFA Europa League) as a result of winning the Liechtenstein Cup every year since 1998, except 2012.

However, Vaduz did come within one second of reaching the first round proper of the UEFA Cup in 2002. With the aggregate scores level, and with opponents Livingston scheduled to go through on away goals, Vaduz won a late corner. The ball was sent into the box, and Marius Zarn hit a goal-bound shot. However, the referee blew the whistle for full-time just before the ball crossed over the line, and Livingston progressed through in controversial circumstances.

For the 2005–06 season, Mats Gren was a coach. In the first round of the 2005–06 UEFA Cup qualifying, FC Vaduz defeated Moldovan opponent FC Dacia Chişinău. In the second round they met the Istanbul club Beşiktaş J.K., against which they have been eliminated.

FC Vaduz started their European campaign in 2009–10 by beating Scottish side Falkirk in the second qualifying round of the Europa League. However, they lost 3–0 on aggregate to Czech side Slovan Liberec in the third qualifying round.

In the 2014–15 Swiss Super League season, Vaduz survived for the first time in their history in the Swiss Super League. They finished in 9th place with 31 points won. They also won their 43rd Liechtenstein cup, becoming world record holders of a domestic cup in the process.

In season 2015–16 FC Vaduz started their European campaign in the 2015–16 UEFA Europa League by beating S.P. La Fiorita from San Marino in the first qualifying round of the Europa League. In the second round, Vaduz progressed against Nõmme Kalju FC to progress into the third qualifying round of the Europa League where they were drawn against fellow Swiss Super League club FC Thun. FC Thun won 2–2 on the away goals rule.

Vaduz won their domestic cup for the forty-fourth time and were eighth in the Swiss Super League. They won a team record thirty-six points. Vaduz player Armando Sadiku represented Albania at Euro 2016.

The team appeared for the first time in a popular sports video game, FIFA 17. This was the first time in history that a team from Liechtenstein appeared in the sports video game series.

After three years in the elite Swiss competition, the only and most awarded Liechtenstein team relegated. It was not a good season 2016–17, where they even changed the coach Giorgio Contini after almost 5 years at the helm, and in his place came the German coach Roland Vrabec, but Vaduz has not succeeded to survive in Swiss Super League.

On 5 September 2018, they terminated the agreement with Roland Vrabec. On September 17, they presented a new coach Mario Frick. He is the first coach from Liechtenstein in history.

In season 2019–20 FC Vaduz started their European campaign in the 2019–20 UEFA Europa League by beating Breiðablik from Iceland in the first qualifying round of the Europa League. In the second round, Vaduz caused a shock by knocking out Hungarian side MOL Fehérvár. In the third qualifying round of the Europa League they played against Eintracht Frankfurt. The Bundesliga team easily won both matches. However, those matches were historic for the club. In the first match in Vaduz there were 5,908 spectators present, while the city as a whole has a population of only 5,521.

On 25 August 2022, after an away victory against Rapid Wien, Vaduz secured qualification for the group stages of the Europa Conference League, becoming the first ever team from Liechtenstein to reach the group stages of a European club competition. They were subsequently drawn into Group E where they played against Dutch side AZ, Cypriot champions Apollon Limassol and Ukrainian side Dnipro-1. After a solid start to the group, with a goalless draw at home to Apollon, Vaduz would only go on and collect one more point, away against Dnipro-1, thus finishing bottom of the group with two points from their six games.

Legal status
Vaduz is one of several expatriate European football clubs, playing in the Swiss Football League, AS Monaco playing in France, San Marino Calcio playing in Italy and some other minor clubs doing likewise in different leagues. The difference between Vaduz and the aforementioned clubs is that its status in Switzerland is a "guest club", and as such it does not participate in the Swiss Cup and cannot represent Switzerland internationally, which makes Champions League qualification from league football impossible under current rules other than by winning the Europa League or the Champions League itself. Since Vaduz has never finished higher than 8th in the Super League and therefore could not be argued to have qualified, such a situation has not occurred.

Stadium

Rheinpark Stadion

The Rheinpark Stadion in Vaduz is the national stadium of Liechtenstein. It plays host to the home matches of the Liechtenstein national football team, and is also the home of Liechtenstein's top football club, FC Vaduz. It lies on the banks of the River Rhine, just metres from the border with Switzerland. The stadium has a fully seated capacity of 5,873, plus additional standing places, giving it a total capacity of 7,584. The building of the stadium cost roughly 19 million CHF.

The stadium was officially opened on 31 July 1998 with a match between FC Vaduz, the Liechtenstein Cup holders at the time, and 1. FC Kaiserslautern, the then Bundesliga champions. Kaiserslautern won the match 8–0. Liverpool F.C. played here against Olympiacos F.C. in a friendly in 2005. Rheinpark Stadion hosted the likes of FC Chornomorets Odesa and Paris Saint-Germain F.C. in this tournament but failed to progress past the qualification rounds.

The construction of the stadium became necessary because the FIFA World governing body FIFA and the European association UEFA threatened not to allow more European and international matches in Liechtenstein if the country did not provide a modern venue in accordance with international standards. In Liechtenstein, no own championship is played, but a cup competition is organized. Its series winner FC Vaduz is therefore represented in the Europa League almost every year. The national team has not been represented in any major competition such as the World or European Championship, but in the qualifications to do so.

Rheinpark Stadion sits less than 1 km west of Vaduz city centre on the eastern bank of the Rhein River. Vaduz holds the distinction of being one of the few capitals in the world to lack its own airport and railway station.

Rheinpark Stadion consists of four stands: North, East, South and West.

There are a limited number of free parking spaces located at Rheinpark Stadion on matchdays which are allocated on a first-come first-served basis.

Current sponsorship
Companies that FC Vaduz currently has sponsorship deals with include:

  Liechtensteinische Landesbank – main sponsor
  MBPI AG – main sponsor
  Puma – kit manufacturer
  Accurata Treuhand und Revisions AG – official sponsor
  Brauerei Schützengarten AG – official sponsor
  Heim Bohrtechnik AG – official sponsor
  Kibernetik AG – official sponsor
  Hirslanden Private Hospital Group – medical partner 
  Orthopädie St. Gallen – medical partner

Crest and colours

Kit manufacturers and shirt sponsors

Honours

Domestic competitions

 Liechtenstein Football Championship
Winners (1): 1936
 Liechtenstein Football Cup
Winners (48) (World Record): 1948–49, 1951–52, 1952–53, 1953–54, 1955–56, 1956–57, 1957–58, 1958–59, 1959–60, 1960–61, 1962, 1965–66, 1966–67, 1967–68, 1968–69, 1969–70, 1970–71, 1973–74, 1979–80, 1984–85, 1986, 1987–88, 1989–90, 1991–92, 1994–95, 1995–96, 1997–98, 1998–99, 1999–2000, 2000–01, 2001–02, 2002–03, 2003–04, 2004–05, 2005–06, 2006–07, 2007–08, 2008–09, 2009–10, 2010–11, 2012–13, 2013–14, 2014–15, 2015–16, 2016–17, 2017–18, 2018–19, 2021–22
Runners-up (13): 1945–46, 1946–47, 1947–48, 1949–50, 1950–51, 1954–55, 1971–72, 1976–77, 1983–84, 1986–87, 1990–91, 1996–97, 2011–12

Switzerland competitions

 Swiss Challenge League (2nd tier)
Winners (3): 2002–03, 2007–08, 2013–14
Runners-up (3): 2003–04, 2004–05, 2019–20

European record

Biggest win in UEFA competition:

Club records
 Biggest European home win: FC Vaduz 5–1  La Fiorita (09.07.2015, UEFA Europa League First qualifying round second leg)
 Biggest European away win:  La Fiorita 0–5 FC Vaduz (02.07.2015, UEFA Europa League First qualifying round first leg)
 Biggest European home defeat: FC Vaduz 0–5  Chornomorets Odesa (19.08.1992, European Cup Winners' Cup), FC Vaduz 0–5  Hradec Králové (10.08.1995, European Cup Winners' Cup), FC Vaduz 0–5  Eintracht Frankfurt (08.08.2019, Europa League)
 Biggest European away defeat:  Hradec Králové 9–1 FC Vaduz (24.08.1995, European Cup Winners' Cup)
 Biggest home win: FC Vaduz 11–0  FC Schaan (04.05.2016, FL–Cup Final)
 Biggest away win:  FC Triesen II 0–22 FC Vaduz (09.11.1999, FL–Cup Quarter-Finals)
 Player with most trophies with FC Vaduz:  Franz Burgmeier (16)
 Player with most appearances:  Franz Burgmeier (371)
 Player with most goals:  Daniele Polverino (91)
 Player with most UEFA appearances:  Daniel Hasler,  Peter Jehle,  Franz Burgmeier (22)
 Player with most Super League appearances:  Philipp Muntwiler (90)
 Most European goals:  Moreno Costanzo,  Moreno Merenda (5)
 Most Super League goals:  Moreno Costanzo (12)
 Most goals in Liechtenstein Cup:  Daniele Polverino (76)
 Highest home game attendance: 6,773 (against  FC Basel,  FC St. Gallen)
 Highest away game attendance (St. Jakob-Park): 27,066 (against  FC Basel)
 Highest European home game attendance: 5,908 (against  Eintracht Frankfurt)
 Highest European away game attendance (Waldstadion): 48,000 (against  Eintracht Frankfurt)
 Most capped foreign player:  Miguel Mea Vitali, 87 caps, Venezuela
 Most capped Liechtenstein player:  Peter Jehle, 132 caps (National Record)

Individual awards

Domestic
The player of the year in Liechtenstein has been announced as the season 1980/81 to 2007/08 as of the end of the season. The open for all election was organized by media house Vaduz. Since 2009, the Liechtenstein Football Association draws the title holder of its own. To this end, the LFV-Award has been launched, annually awarded a title in which professional bodies and public in three categories. The categories are Footballer of the Year, Young Player of the Year and Coach of the Year.

Liechtensteiner Footballer of the Year

Liechtensteiner Young Player of the Year

Special prize LFV Award

Liechtensteiner Coach of the Year

Switzerland

Swiss Challenge League top scorers

Swiss Challenge League dream team

International

To celebrate the Union of European Football Associations (UEFA)'s 50th anniversary in 2004, each of its member associations was asked by UEFA to choose one of its own players as the single most outstanding player of the past 50 years (1954–2003).

Golden Player

Team awards

Fairplay Trophy

Rankings

UEFA ranking

As of 12 March

Club world ranking

As of 31 December 2015

Swiss Super League history

In the 2007–08 season, for the first time in their history, FC Vaduz earned promotion to Swiss Super League. Two times before was relegated in Barrage in the season 2003–04 against Neuchâtel Xamax and 2004–05 against FC Schaffhausen. In the 2015–16 season they finished on the 8th place in front of FC Lugano and FC Zürich who is that season relegated in Swiss Challenge League. After two seasons FC Vaduz was relegated in Swiss Challenge League. In the 2019–20 season Vaduz finished in second place and played in the barrage against FC Thun and Vaduz promoted in Super League fifth time in history.

{|class="wikitable" style="text-align:center"
|-
!style="width:60px"|Season
!style="width:40px"|
!style="width:28px"|
!style="width:28px"|
!style="width:28px"|
!style="width:28px"|
!style="width:28px"|
!style="width:28px"|
!style="width:28px"|
!
|-
|2008–09
|10
|36
|5
|7
|24
|28
|85
|22
|2,177
|-
|2014–15
|9
|36
|7
|10
|19
|28
|59
|31
|4,152
|-
|2015–16
|8
|36
|7
|15
|14
|44
|60
|36
|4,006
|-
|2016–17
|10
|36
|7
|9
|20
|45
|78
|30
|4,086
|-
|-
|2020–21
|10
|36
|9
|9
|18
|36
|58
|36
|227
|-
|Total
|
|180
|35
|50
|95
|181
|340
|155
|2,930
|}

Players

Current squad

Out on loan

Technical staff

FC Vaduz U23

FC Vaduz U23 is the reserve team of FC Vaduz. They currently play in the 2. Liga (sixth tier of the Swiss football league system). In the season 2014–15 they played semi-finals in Liechtenstein Cup against FC Triesenberg and they lost 1–0 after extra time.

Current squad

Technical staff

Recent seasons
Recent season-by-season performance of the club:

Key
P - games played; W- wins; D- draws; L- losses; GF- goals for; GA - goals against; PTS - points

QR - Qualifying Round; QR1 - Qualifying Round 1; QR2 - Qualifying Round 2; QR3 - Qualifying Round 3

Former players

A few former players are considered by the fans to be especially memorable because of their long and outstanding contributions towards the club, to some degree even decades after the end of their careers. Therefore, they have a very special status with the fans. The following are a few examples:

 Armando Sadiku  (player 2016)
 Jodel Dossou  (player 2018–2019)
 Odirlei de Souza Gaspar  (player 2005–2009)
 Stjepan Kukuruzović  (player 2015–2017)
 Markus Neumayr  (player 2013–2015)
 Nick Proschwitz  (player 2010–2011)
 Pak Kwang-ryong  (player 2013–2015)
 Hekuran Kryeziu  (player 2014–2015)
 Nicolas Hasler  (player 2011–2017)
 Martin Stocklasa  (player 1997–1999, 2002–2006)
 Rainer Hasler  (player 1978–1979)
 Pape Omar Faye  (player 2006–2007)
 Dušan Cvetinović  (player 2011–2013)
 Goran Obradović   (player 2005)
 Pascal Schürpf  (player 2013–2017)
 Simone Grippo  (player 2013–2017)
 Moreno Merenda  (player 2001–2002, 2010–2012)
 Yann Sommer  (player 2007–2009)
 Fakhreddine Galbi  (player 2008–2009)
 Marko Dević  (player 2017–2018)
 Caleb Stanko  (player 2016–2017)

Players of Vaduz at major international tournaments

Former managers

  Otto Pfister (1961–63)
  Tibor Lőrincz (1969–71)
  Željko Perušić (1974–75)
  Peter Blusch (1980–82)
  Hans Krostina (1983–85)
  Helmut Richert (1989–90)
  Hans Trittinger (1990–91)
  Hans-Joachim Abel (1994–96)
  Hansruedi Fässler (1996–97)
  Alfons Dobler (1997–99)
  Uwe Wegmann (1999–02)
  Walter Hörmann (2002–03)
  Martin Andermatt (2003–05)
  Hans-Joachim Weller (2005)
  Mats Gren (2005–06)
  Maurizio Jacobacci (2006–07)
  Hans-Joachim Weller (2007)
  Heinz Hermann (2007–08)
  Pierre Littbarski (2008–10)
  Eric Orie (2010–12)
  Sebastian Selke (2012) (Interim)
  Giorgio Contini (2012–17)
  Daniel Hasler (2017) (Interim)
  Roland Vrabec (2017–2018)
  Mario Frick (2018–2022)
  Alessandro Mangiarratti (2022)
  Jürgen Seeberger (2023)
  Jan Meyer (interim) (2023)
  Martin Stocklasa (2023–present)

Gallery

Former presidents

  Johannes Walser (1932–1933)
  Willy Huber (1933–1934)
  Anton Konrad (1934–1936)
  Rudolf Strub (1936–1943)
  Hans Verling (1943–1948)
  Albert Caminada (1948–1950)
  Felix Real (1950–1951)
  Hans Verling (1951–1955)
  Anton Ospelt (1955–1956)
  Otto Hasler (1956–1961)
  Engelbert Schreiber (1961–1964)
  Hilmar Ospelt (1964–1967)
  Kurt Frommelt (1967–1971)
  Norbert Vogt (1971–1973)
  Reinhard Walser (1973–1979)
  Reinold Ospelt (1979–1983)
  Alfons Thöny (1983–1988)
  Andy Rechsteiner (1988–1990)
  Werner Keicher (1990–1997)
  Manfred Moser (1997–2001)
  Marc Brogle (2001–2003)
  Hanspeter Negele (2003–2008)
  Franz Schädler (2008–2009) (Interim)
  Lorenz Gassner (2009–2010) (Acting)
  Albin Johann (2010–2013)
  Ruth Ospelt (2013–2019)
  Patrick Burgmeier (2019–)

FC Vaduz Red Pride Rugby

On 12 March 2012 the new club FC Vaduz Rugby was founded. The rugby union club is involved in the grassroots of the FC Vaduz. Rugby union in Liechtenstein is a minor but growing sport. Liechtenstein has no national governing body of its own, but comes under the Swiss Rugby Federation.

References

External links

Erster offizieller Fanclub 04 
FC Vaduz Ostschweizer Fussballverband (Swiss Football League) 

 
Football clubs in Liechtenstein
Association football clubs established in 1932
Expatriated football clubs
1932 establishments in Liechtenstein